Singles is a 1992 American romantic comedy film written, co-produced, and directed by Cameron Crowe, and starring Bridget Fonda, Campbell Scott, Kyra Sedgwick, and Matt Dillon. It features appearances from several musicians prominent in the early 1990s grunge movement in Seattle.

The film was distributed by Warner Bros. and released theatrically on September 18, 1992 to generally positive reviews from critics and moderate box office success, grossing over $18 million.

Plot
Singles centers on the precarious romantic lives of a group of young Gen X'ers in Seattle, Washington at the height of the 1990s grunge phenomenon. Most of the characters dwell in an apartment block, a sign in front of which advertises "Singles" (single bedroom apartments) for rent. Divided into chapters, the film focuses on the course of two couples' rocky romances, as well as the love lives of their friends and associates.

The film revolves around Janet Livermore, a coffee-bar waitress fawning over Cliff Poncier, an aspiring yet slightly aloof grunge rock musician of the fictional grunge/rock band Citizen Dick; Linda Powell and Steve Dunne, a couple wavering on whether to commit to each other; Debbie Hunt, trying to find Mr. Right.

Cast

 Bridget Fonda as Janet Livermore
 Campbell Scott as Steve Dunne
 Kyra Sedgwick as Linda Powell
 Sheila Kelley as Debbie Hunt
 Jim True-Frost as David Bailey
 Matt Dillon as Cliff Poncier
 Bill Pullman as Dr. Jeffrey Jamison
 James LeGros as Andy
 Devon Raymond as Ruth
 Camilo Gallardo as Luiz
 Ally Walker as Pam
 Eric Stoltz as The Mime
 Jeremy Piven as Doug Hughley
 Tom Skerritt as Mayor Weber
 Peter Horton as Jamie

Eddie Vedder, Stone Gossard and Jeff Ament play the band members of Citizen Dick. There are appearances from Alice in Chains and Soundgarden, as well as cameos by film director Tim Burton and basketball player Xavier McDaniel as himself. Paul Giamatti appears in a minor role.

Johnny Depp was offered the role of Steve Dunne but declined.

Production
Filming began on March 11, 1991. Principal photography wrapped on May 24, 1991.

The film was shot at a number of locations around Seattle and includes scenes at Gas Works Park, Capitol Hill, Jimi Hendrix's original grave at Greenwood Memorial Park in Renton, the Pike Place Market and the Virginia Inn. The central coffee shop featured in the film is the now-closed OK Hotel. The apartment building is located on the northwest corner of the intersection of E. Thomas St & 19th Ave E. (1820 E. Thomas St.). Additional concert footage was shot in the now-defunct RKCNDY bar. Alice in Chains' concert was filmed at the Desoto nightclub. Also, Soundgarden makes an appearance in the film.

Most of Matt Dillon's wardrobe in the movie actually belonged to Pearl Jam bassist Jeff Ament. During the making of the film, Ament produced a list of song titles for the fictional band, Citizen Dick. Chris Cornell took it as a challenge to write songs for the film using those titles, and "Spoonman" was one of them. An early acoustic version of the song was created and can be heard in the background during a scene of the film. Citizen Dick's song "Touch Me, I'm Dick" is a parody of the song "Touch Me, I'm Sick" by the Seattle band Mudhoney. On the inside cover photo of the soundtrack, there is a Citizen Dick CD with the track listing on the CD itself. One of the songs is called "Louder Than Larry (Steiner)", a wordplay on the Soundgarden album, Louder Than Love.

Reception
Singles holds a 79% critical approval rating on the review aggregator Rotten Tomatoes based on 52 reviews with an average rating of 7/10. The site's critical consensus reads "Smart, funny, and engagingly scruffy, Singles is a clear-eyed look at modern romance that doubles as a credible grunge-era time capsule".

Roger Ebert of The Chicago Sun-Times was complimentary, giving Singles three out of four stars and declaring it "is not a great cutting-edge movie, and parts of it may be too whimsical and disorganized for audiences raised on cause-and-effect plots. But I found myself smiling a lot during the movie, sometimes with amusement, sometimes with recognition. It's easy to like these characters, and care about them." Tim Appelo wrote in Entertainment Weekly, "With ... an ambling, naturalistic style, Crowe captures the eccentric appeal of a town where espresso carts sprout on every corner and kids in ratty flannel shirts can cut records that make them millionaires." Meanwhile, Seattle's The Stranger was less kind to Crowe's use of the local background, reviewing "he's relying on the general hipness of our little burg and on the star power of a few local musicians/bit actors to make a bundle of dough, and he hasn't bothered to back them up with anything worth remembering. Pleasant is about the only word I can think of to describe the thing."

Warner Bros. Television immediately tried to turn Singles into a television series. Crowe claims that Singles inspired the television series Friends.

On July 5, 2015, Derek Erdman held a public screening of the movie in the courtyard of Capitol Hill's Coryell Court Apartments—the building in which some of the main characters live. The event was attended by over 1,000 people. Despite initial concerns by the landlord, the event went off smoothly. The crowd was respectful and cleaned up after themselves. Reports of Bridget Fonda being in attendance were false. It was actually her aunt, Jane Fonda.

The film is recognized by American Film Institute in these lists:
 2002: AFI's 100 Years...100 Passions – Nominated

Soundtrack

The Singles soundtrack was released on June 30, 1992, through Epic Records and became a best seller three months before the release of the film. The soundtrack included music from key bands from the Seattle music scene of the time, such as Alice in Chains, Pearl Jam, and Soundgarden. Pearl Jam performed two previously-unreleased songs on the soundtrack: "Breath" and "State of Love and Trust". The Soundgarden song "Birth Ritual" and Chris Cornell's solo song "Seasons" appear on the soundtrack. Paul Westerberg of The Replacements contributed two songs to the soundtrack and provided the score for the film. The Smashing Pumpkins also contributed to the soundtrack with the song "Drown".

References

External links

 
 
 
 
 
 "Making the Scene: A Filmmaker's Diary" – A log kept by Crowe during the production of Singles and published in Rolling Stone in October 1992

1992 films
1992 romantic comedy films
American romantic comedy films
1990s English-language films
Films directed by Cameron Crowe
Films produced by Cameron Crowe
Films set in Seattle
Films set in Washington (state)
Films shot in Washington (state)
Grunge
Films with screenplays by Cameron Crowe
Warner Bros. films
1990s American films